Stait is a surname. Notable people with the surname include:

Brent Stait (born 1959), Canadian actor
Carolyn Stait (born 1957), English Royal Navy officer
Don Stait (1928–2007), Australian rugby league footballer

See also
Staite
Strait (surname)